The list of shipwrecks in 1799 includes ships sunk, foundered, grounded, wrecked or otherwise lost during 1799.

January

1 January

2 January

3 January

4 January

7 January

8 January

11 January

12 January

15 January

19 January

20 January

25 January

31 January

Unknown date

February

1 February

2 February

8 February

10 February

11 February

23 February

Unknown date

March

7 March

15 March

17 March

27 March

29 March

31 March

Unknown date

April

5 April

22 April

Unknown date

May

8 May

18 May

21 May

23 May

Unknown date

June

2 June

13 June

Unknown date

July

6 July

7 July

10 July

11 July

Unknown date

August

6 August

7 August

21 August

Unknown date

September

1 September

10 September

11 September

14 September

18 September

22 September

28 September

Unknown date

October

1 October

3 October

9 October

10 October

14 October

17 October

18 October

23 October

25 October

31 October

Unknown date

November

1 November

2 November

4 November

5 November

12 November

17 November

21 November

26 November

Unknown date

December

2 December

6 December

10 December

14 December

16 December

18 December

19 December

23 December

25 December

26 December

27 December

29 December

30 December

Unknown date

Unknown date

References

1799